Stupino is a rural locality (a selo) and the administrative center of Stupinskoye Rural Settlement, Ramonsky District, Voronezh Oblast, Russia. The population was 605 as of 2010. There are 20 streets.

Geography 
Stupino is located 13 km northeast of Ramon (the district's administrative centre) by road. Beryozovo is the nearest rural locality.

References 

Rural localities in Ramonsky District